Nemesia grandiflora is a species of plant from South Africa.

Description 
This plant is an erect perennial herb. It may have a simple or branched growth form and is nearly hairless. Plants have two kinds of leaves. The root leaves have an oblong shape and are wedge-shaped at the base. They grow on stalks. The stem leaves are linear and grow directly on the stems. The margins have few teeth.

The floral leaves are bract-like. The inflorescence is glandular with lance-shaped or linear calyx segments. The corolla tubes are oblong with large lower lobes. The throat is bearded with a shaggy opening. The spur is short and conical. The capsule is oval shaped with two short horns.

Distribution and habitat 
This species is endemic to the Western Cape of South Africa. It grows in Hopefield, near Malmsbury.

References 

Plants described in 1896
Flora of South Africa
grandiflora